Graham Maby (born 1 September 1952), is an English bass guitar player.  He has recorded and toured with Joe Jackson since his first album, appearing on most of Jackson's albums and tours.  He has continued to record and tour with Jackson even while working with other artists.

Maby was born in Gosport. In the late 1980s and early 1990s, he toured with Graham Parker, Garland Jeffreys, the Silos, and Darden Smith, among others. In 1996, Maby joined They Might Be Giants, recording and touring with them. From 1998 until 2002, he recorded and toured with Natalie Merchant's band. Maby has also recorded with Marshall Crenshaw, Joan Baez, Freedy Johnston, Henry Lee Summer, Ian Hunter, Regina Spektor and Dar Williams.

Along with playing bass, Maby also produced  several tracks on Johnston's 1992 album, Can You Fly. He can be seen in the 1986 movie Peggy Sue Got Married as a member of Marshall Crenshaw's band.

Graham's wife, Mary Beth (née Bernard) Maby, died on 12 January 2012 after a two-year battle with bladder cancer. He has two children, Claire and Pierce.

His first-born son Christopher, also an aspiring musician and actor, died in 1998.

Discography

With Joe Jackson:
Look Sharp!
I'm the Man
Beat Crazy
Jumpin' Jive
Night and Day
Mike's Murder
Body and Soul
Live 1980/86
Blaze of Glory
Laughter & Lust
Night Music
Summer in the City: Live in New York
Night and Day II
Volume 4
Afterlife
Rain
Live Music - Europe 2010
Live at Rockpalast
Fast Forward ("New York" section)
Fool

With They Might Be Giants:
John Henry
Why Does The Sun Shine? (EP)
Back To Skull
Factory Showroom
Severe Tire Damage
Long Tall Weekend
Working Undercover For The Man

With Natalie Merchant:
Ophelia
Live in New York City
Motherland
The House Carpenter's Daughter

With Freedy Johnston:
Can You Fly
Unlucky
This Perfect World (Elektra, 1994)
Never Home
Right Between the Promises

With Marshall Crenshaw:
Mary Jean and Nine Others
Good Evening
My Truck Is My Home
What's In The Bag?

With Ian Hunter:
Shrunken Heads

With Joan Baez:
Bowery Songs

With Dar Williams:
The Green World

With Regina Spektor:
Soviet Kitsch

With Chris Stamey:
It's Alright
Fireworks

With Darden Smith:
Little Victories
Deep Fantastic Blue

With Henry Lee Summer:
Henry Lee Summer
I've Got Everything

With Billy Simons:
Music For The Motion Picture

See also
List of bass guitarists

References

External links

1952 births
Living people
English bass guitarists
English male guitarists
Male bass guitarists
People from Gosport
English session musicians
British rock bass guitarists
The Silos members
They Might Be Giants members